Mozambique competed in its second commonwealth Games in 2002. It sent six male athletes to the games and three females, competing in athletics, badminton, boxing and swimming. Maria Lurdes Mutola won the nation's only medal, a gold in the women's 800 meters, finishing over a second ahead of her nearest rival.

Medals

Gold
Athletics:
 Maria Lurdes Mutola, women's 800 meters

See also
2002 Commonwealth Games results

References

Moz
Com
Nations at the 2002 Commonwealth Games